Cheirodon mitopterus is a species of fish in the family Characidae.

Description
It has an elongate, compressed body. It has 32–34 vertebrae and is of a shady green colour with bright silver shading on the sides.

Distribution
Central Panama.

See also
Cheirodon dialepturus

References

External links
ZipcodeZoo entry
Fishwise entry

mitopterus
Taxa named by William Lee Fink
Taxa named by Stanley Howard Weitzman
Fish described in 1974